Armoy may refer to the following places:
 Armoy, County Antrim, Northern Ireland
 Armoy railway station
 Armoy, Haute-Savoie, France
 Fermoy (barony), County Cork, Ireland; formerly also called Armoy